"Fanfare" is a song recorded by South Korean girl group Twice. It is the group's sixth Japanese maxi single, featuring three other tracks. It was pre-released for digital download and streaming on June 18, 2020, by Warner Music Japan as the first single from their third Japanese studio album, Perfect World. The single and its B-side, "More & More" (Japanese version), were physically released on July 8 in Japan.

Promotion 
On July 4, 2020, Twice performed "Fanfare" for the first time on NHK's music program Shibuya Note.

Track listing

Charts

Weekly charts

Year-end charts

Certifications

|-
! scope="col" colspan="3" |  Streaming
|-

See also
 List of Hot 100 number-one singles of 2020 (Japan)
 List of Oricon number-one singles of 2020

References

2020 singles
2020 songs
Japanese-language songs
Twice (group) songs